The following is a list of symbols of the U.S. state of Rhode Island.

Insignia

Living symbols

Earth symbols

Cultural symbols

United States coin

References
 

Rhode Island

Symbols